Sergio Pablos is a Spanish animator, director and screenwriter. While at the helm of his company (The SPA Studios), Pablos developed several concepts for animated feature films, most notably the original ideas upon which Despicable Me (Universal Pictures and Illumination Entertainment in 2010) and Smallfoot (produced by the Warner Animation Group in 2018) were based.

Most recently, the SPA Studios has produced Netflix's first original animated feature film, Klaus, written and directed by Pablos.

Early life 
Sergio Pablos is from Barcelona. After working as a key animator on Once Upon a Forest (1993), he moved to Paris, France, to pursue a career opportunity at Walt Disney Animation Studios where he worked on The Hunchback of Notre Dame (1996) and Hercules (1997).  Pablos was then promoted to a Supervising Animator position at Disney Feature Animation in Burbank, handling the character of Tantor the elephant on Tarzan (1999), and Dr. Doppler on Treasure Planet (2002), the latter of which garnered him a nomination for Best Character Animation at the Annie Awards.

Career 
Pablos' first job in animation with Disney Studios in Paris was as a character designer on A Goofy Movie (1995).  From that connection he moved to Walt Disney Animation Studios and began learning the ropes, working as animator or contributing to character designs on several major 2D animation productions, including The Hunchback of Notre Dame (character of Frollo), Hercules (character of Hades), Tarzan (character of Tantor the elephant), and Treasure Planet (character of Doctor Doppler).  He was nominated for an Annie Award for his work on Treasure Planet.  Subsequent to his departure from Disney, he was hired as character design supervisor on Stuart Little 3: Call of the Wild for Columbia.

After several more years working in animation production, Pablos created the Despicable Me franchise based on his original screen story Evil Me and his own art design.  He took the package unsolicited to Universal Pictures where he became the first of several screenwriters on the project as well as executive producer. In 2010, Despicable Me—starring Steve Carell, Jason Segel, Russell Brand, Kristen Wiig, Miranda Cosgrove, Will Arnett, and Julie Andrews—was a box office success, received a Golden Globe nomination, and became one of animation's highest-grossing movies. Pablos continued work as a character designer on another animated feature, Rio for 20th Century Fox, which was released the following year. He received his second Annie Award nomination for Rio. After the release of Despicable Me 2 in 2013, theatrical markets (worldwide box office) and ancillary markets (home media, cable, merchandising, books, video games, TV series, theme parks, etc.), pushed franchise total revenues to over ten figures. He was the writer for the film Warner Animation Group's Smallfoot. He then formed Sergio Pablos Animation Studios in Madrid, Spain, where he made his directorial debut with Klaus.

Personal life 
Pablos shares his time between the U.S. and Spain where he is CEO and Creative Director of The SPA Studios in Madrid.

Filmography

Filmmaking credits

Animation credits

Awards and nominations

References

External links 
 Sergio Pablos at Internet Movie Database

Annie Award winners
Living people
People from Madrid
Spanish animated film directors
Spanish animators
Spanish film directors
Spanish screenwriters
Walt Disney Animation Studios people
Year of birth missing (living people)